The Antimary State Forest is a state forest in the state of Acre, Brazil.
It was the first state forest in Acre, established with the goal of understanding and implementing sustainable forest exploitation, including extraction of nuts and rubber as well as selective extraction of timber. It has been extensively studied and discussed internationally as a model of sustainable forest management.

Location

The Antimary State Forest is divided between the municipalities of Sena Madureira (26.94%) and Bujari (73.06%) in the eastern part of the state of Acre.
It is north of the BR-364 highway, and is bounded by the border with the state of Amazonas to the northeast.

Environment

Soils are mainly dystrophic yellow latosols with high clay content.
The dry season from June to September is used for slash-and-burn land clearance for agriculture and for forest management and logging.
Satellite images show that the forest is:
21.5% open rainforest with palms and dense alluvial rainforest with uniform canopy
15.8% open lowland rainforest with dominant bamboo
30.2% open rainforest with bamboo and dense lowland rainforest with emergent canopy
12.0% dense lowland rainforest with emergent canopy and open rainforest with dominant bamboo
19.5% dense lowland rainforest with emergent canopy
The most common flora are from the Caesalpinaceae, Mimosaceae, Moraceae, Fabaceae and Euphorbiaceae families.
The State of Acre Technology Foundation (FUNTAC) has identified 625 species of flora including 361 of trees and 18 of palm trees.

Background

The Antimary River is first mentioned in a 1907 letter by José Plácido de Castro on navigation of the Acre River. He described the main geographical points of the Antimary, a tributary of the Acre.
He noted that there were several shacks on the river banks, indicating the presence of rubber tappers.
The area of the forest was declared a reserve on 26 June 1911, but nothing more was done at the time.
Before Antimary State Forest was created there were 80–100 families living in the forest. 
Most of the population were rubber tappers, and most come from Acre.
About 28% come from other states, particularly Ceará.

The Antimary State Forest Project was created in 1988 by decree 8.843, the first such in Acre.
It was a joint project of the state government and the International Tropical Timber Organization (ITTO) with focus on gaining basic information on the forest's physical aspects, flora, fauna, people and land use. By the 1990s studies were considering sustainable use of multiple forest resources, economic feasibility and issues of forestry concessions.
Despite the value of non-timber products to the local population and the economy, timber was considered to be the product with the greatest economic potential.

History

It has become one of the most studied public forests in the world.
In 2002 it was chosen by ITTO as one of the three best examples of forests funded by that organisation.
It was presented as a side event at Earth Summit 2002 (Rio + 10).
Other than trials in 2003 and 2004, as of 2005 no formal logging had been undertaken.
The consultative council was created on 31 December 2004.

Various adjustments were made to the original area, with land added in 1998 and land lost to the state of Amazonas by a boundary adjustment. 
In 2005 the forest received certification from the Rainforest Alliance's SmartWood Program.

Decree 13321 of 1 December 2005 amended the forest's limits to contain .
On 13 December 2005 the Instituto Nacional de Colonização e Reforma Agrária (National Institute for Colonization and Agrarian Reform) recognised the forest as an agro-extractive project for 250 families, who would now qualify for assistance under PRONAF (National Program for the Strengthening of Family Farming).

The forest is valuable as a research site.
The state of Acre funds ten graduate and undergraduate students to research forest management and forest product processing in Antimary.
A study published in 2012 reported results of estimating above-ground biomass (AGB) and identifying low-intensity logging areas in the forest using airborne scanning lidar. 
Scans were made of two unlogged areas in the forest and one with low-intensity selective logging.
A model-assisted estimator and synthetic estimator both gave accurate measures of the amount of biomass that had been removed, as confirmed by ground-based checks.
Even when the residual canopy remained closed, the lidar could identify harvest areas, roads, skid trails and landings, and the reduction of biomass that had resulted.

People and economy

The state of Acre coordinates management through the Acre State Forests Department (SEF), working with businesses, communities and technical advisers of the State of Acre Technology Foundation (FUNTAC) and Amazon Workers Center (CTA).
There were two forest engineers and eight technicians.

By 2003 the forest was inhabited by 109 families with 383 people, mainly rubber tappers, organised into two associations and one cooperative.
Their main income came from extraction of Brazil nuts (100 tonnes) and rubber (12 tonnes), followed by copaiba oil (260 litres), forest seeds (1,270 kilograms).
They also engage in subsistence agriculture and timber extraction.
In the rainy season the Antimary River is the only transport route for families living in the state forest, used for carrying Brazil nuts, rubber and cassava flour.
The project headquarters in 2003 had an access road, lodgings and telephone service.
There were four health centres. 
90% of the residents had been vaccinated and there had been no malaria cases for three years.
Both adults and children enrolled in three schools, and illiteracy had dropped from 90% to 15%.

The proportion of processed wood products coming from managed forests in Acre grew from 5.7% in 2002 to 84% in 2008.
By 2008 forestry accounted for 19% of Acre's economy and half the state's exports by value.
The Antimary State Forest was still the only certified public forest in Brazil.
There were mixed feeling about the shift to timber extraction among the residents of the Acre forests, with many still remembering their struggle to preserve the forests as extractivists and rubber tappers against loggers and ranchers from other states, while some accepted timber management as a way to gain more from the forest, despite the rigorous certification rules.

Notes

Sources

1997 establishments in Brazil
State forests of Brazil
Protected areas of Acre (state)
Protected areas established in 1997